Stanley B. Lippman is a computer scientist and author. He is most widely known as an author of the C++ Primer book, which is currently published as 5th edition. Lippman has also authored the book Inside the C++ Object Model.  He worked with Bjarne Stroustrup at Bell Laboratories during early stages of C++ development. In 2001, Lippman became an architect for Visual C++. In 2007, he joined Emergent Game Technologies. He then worked for NASA, Pixar and is now working at 2kQubits according to his LinkedIn page.

Books

References 

American computer scientists
American technology writers
Living people
Year of birth missing (living people)